Dharan Singh Dahiya (born 12 July 1967) is an Indian wrestler. He competed in the men's freestyle 62 kg at the 1992 Summer Olympics.

References

1967 births
Living people
Indian male sport wrestlers
Olympic wrestlers of India
Wrestlers at the 1992 Summer Olympics
Place of birth missing (living people)